The 2010 Seoul mayoral election was held on 2 June 2010 as part of the 5th local elections.

Selection of candidates

Grand National Party

Democratic Party

Liberty Forward Party

New Progressive Party

Final candidates

Results

Summary

By districts

References 

Seoul mayoral elections
June 2010 events in South Korea
2010 in South Korea